Denis C. Feeney, FBA (born 1955) is Professor of Classics and Giger Professor of Latin at Princeton University. He was born in New Zealand and educated at St Peter's College, Auckland and Auckland Grammar School. He received his B.A. (1974), MA in Latin (1975) and MA in Greek (1976) from the University of Auckland and a D.Phil. from Oxford University in 1982. He has also been a Fellow of Magdalene College, Cambridge and New College, Oxford.

Professor Feeney is especially known for his highly influential book The Gods in Epic on the interaction between Roman literature and religion, and his recent book Caesar's Calendar: Ancient Time and the Beginnings of History (University of California Press, 2008). In 2016 he was elected a Fellow of the American Academy of Arts and Sciences and a Corresponding Fellow of the British Academy.

Books 
 The Gods in Epic: Poets and Critics of the Classical Tradition. Oxford UP. (1991)
 Literature and religion at Rome: Cultures, contexts, and beliefs. Cambridge UP. (1998)
 Traditions and Contexts in the Poetry of Horace. Cambridge UP. (2002)
 Caesar's Calendar: Ancient Time and the Beginnings of History. California UP. (2008)
 Beyond Greek: The Beginnings of Latin Literature. Harvard UP. (2016) {Review by T. P. Wiseman}

References

American classical scholars
Living people
New Zealand classical scholars
New Zealand people of Irish descent
Alumni of the University of Oxford
Fellows of Magdalene College, Cambridge
Fellows of New College, Oxford
Classical scholars of Princeton University
University of Auckland alumni
People educated at St Peter's College, Auckland
People educated at Auckland Grammar School
1955 births
Scholars of Latin literature
Corresponding Fellows of the British Academy